Croyle can refer to:

 Brodie Croyle, American football player
 Croyle Township, Cambria County, Pennsylvania